The Boeing Model 1, also known as the B & W Seaplane, was a United States single-engine biplane seaplane aircraft. It was the first Boeing product and carried the initials of its designers, William Boeing and Lt. Conrad Westervelt USN.

Design
The first B & W was completed in June 1916 at Boeing's boathouse hangar on Lake Union in Seattle, Washington.  It was made of wood, with wire bracing, and was linen-covered. It was similar to the Martin trainer aircraft that Boeing owned, but the B & W had better pontoons and a more powerful engine. The first B & W was named Bluebill, and the second was named Mallard. They first flew on 15 June 1916, and in November.

Operational history
The two B & Ws were offered to the United States Navy. When the Navy did not buy them, they were sold to the New Zealand Flying School and became the company's first international sale. On June 25, 1919, the B&W set a New Zealand altitude record of 6,500 feet. The B & Ws were later used for express and airmail deliveries, making New Zealand's first official airmail flight on December 16, 1919.

Former Operators

New Zealand Flying School

Specifications (B & W Seaplane)

References

 Bowers, Peter M. Boeing aircraft since 1916. London: Putnam Aeronautical Books, 1989. .

External links 
Photo of Boeing Model 1 in Raglan Harbour in 1920

Single-engined tractor aircraft
1910s United States military utility aircraft
Floatplanes
001, Boeing
Biplanes
Aircraft first flown in 1916